David Auld Kilgour  (born ) is a New Zealand songwriter, musician and recording artist from Dunedin. He first started playing guitar as a teenager in the late 1970s. With brother Hamish he formed The Clean, a group that went on to become one of the most popular and most respected bands in New Zealand.

Early life and family
Born in Ranfurly, Kilgour is the son of McGregor Kilgour and Helen Stewart Kilgour (née Auld). He was educated at Otago Boys' High School from 1974 to 1976.

Career

1980s: The Clean and The Great Unwashed
In 1980, Kilgour was one of the founders of New Zealand independent rock band, The Clean. The Clean broke up in the mid- 1980s and David Kilgour proceeded to form and play with other bands such as Stephen and The Great Unwashed. The Clean reformed in 1989 and produced the album Vehicle.

1990s-present: Solo career
In 1991, Kilgour released his debut solo album Here Come the Cars, which received much critical acclaim and peaked at number 35 on the New Zealand chart.
In 1994 Kilgour released his second studio album, Sugar Mouth. 

In 1995 Kilgour released First Steps and False Alarms, a compilation of recordings and demos, the so-called "best of the worst", between the late '80s and early '90s. In 1997 he released his third album, David Kilgour and the Heavy Eights.

At the 2001 New Year Honours, Kilgour was appointed a Member of the New Zealand Order of Merit, for services to music. That same year, he released his 4th studio album, A Feather in the Engine.

In 2004, Kilgour released his fifth solo album Frozen Orange. The making of Frozen Orange was documented by filmmaker Bridget Sutherland in the film Far Off Town: Dunedin to Nashville. The film screened at Raindance Film Festival, London; Nashville Film Festival, San Francisco Film Festival, Aarhus Festival of Independent Arts, Denmark and was nominated for ‘Best Feature Documentary’ at DOCNZ, 2007.  

In February 2007 Kilgour released his sixth solo album, The Far Now.

Discography

Studio albums

Demo albums

Extended plays

See also
 The Clean discography

Awards and nominations

Aotearoa Music Awards
The Aotearoa Music Awards (previously known as New Zealand Music Awards (NZMA)) are an annual awards night celebrating excellence in New Zealand music and have been presented annually since 1965.

! 
|-
| 1993 || David Kilgour || Song writer of the Year||  ||rowspan="2"| 
|-
| 1995 || David Kilgour || Male Artist of the Year||  
|-
| 2017 || David Kilgour (as part of The Clean) || New Zealand Music Hall of Fame ||  || 
|-

References

 Dix, John, Stranded in Paradise, Penguin, 2005. 
 Eggleton, David, Ready To Fly, Craig Potton, 2003.

External links
David Kilgour at Allmusic
David Kilgour at Flying Nun
Official David Kilgour website
The Clean and David Kilgour discography

1960s births
Living people
People from Ranfurly, New Zealand
Musicians from Dunedin
Members of the New Zealand Order of Merit
Flying Nun Records artists
Dunedin Sound musicians
People educated at Otago Boys' High School
The Clean members
The Chills members
Year of birth missing (living people)
Merge Records artists